Ranarius was a seventh-century bishop of Urgell in northern Spain, known to have participated in the fourth Council of Toledo in 633.

References

Year of birth missing
Bishops of Urgell
7th-century bishops in the Visigothic Kingdom
Year of death missing